The city of Allentown, Pennsylvania is nationally-known for its park system.  Much of Allentown's park system can be attributed to the efforts of industrialist General Harry Clay Trexler (1854-1933). Trexler had been inspired by the City Beautiful movement in 1906 and chose to bring in B. A. Hamilton, a nationally known city park consultant.  Haldeman provided the plans for the development of the growing city, and J. Franklin Meehan of Philadelphia was the landscape architect who laid out the parks.

Allen Park, in the vicinity of Trout Hall, was the first city park in Allentown, although it did not become city property until 1908.   West Park, a  park in what was a community trash pit and sandlot baseball field became the first public park  established in an upscale area of the city.  In 1906 General Trexler hired Meehan to lay out a park on the land, which opened in 1909.  West Park features a bandshell, designed by noted Philadelphia architect Horace Trumbauer, which has long been home to the Allentown Band and other community bands.

Soon afterwards, it became apparent that a need existed for recreational facilities for children and young people. Meetings of the Allentown City Council were held about this and several proposals were presented and discussed. In 1912, the city's first public playground was established at Fountain Park.  During the summer vacation months, all Allentown School District school grounds are open as neighborhood playgrounds.

Trexler also facilitated the development of Cedar Creek Park, the Allentown Municipal Golf Course and the Trout Nursery in Lehigh Parkway. After his death in 1933, Trexler's summer estate, a 142-acre tract was willed to the City of Allentown and was renamed Trexler Memorial Park.  Today, the Harry C. Trexler Trust continues to provide private funding for the maintenance and development of Allentown's park system.

List of places
The following is a list of city parks and recreation facilities located in Allentown:

 Allen Park
 South 4th & West Union Streets  
 Map location: 
 Part of Trout Hall and Lehigh Country Heritage Museum

 Allentown Municipal Golf Course
 3200 block West Tilghman Street  
 Map location: 
 Public 18 hole golf course, clubhouse.

 Arts Park
 North 4th & West Court Streets    
 Map location: 
 On Allentown Arts Walk across from Allentown Art Museum, now home to a duo of monumental bronze statues by the French Painter and sculptor Jean-Léon Gérôme, "Metallurgical Worker" and "Metallurgical Science" (1903) celebrating steel workers and the steel era

 Earl F. Hunsicker Bicentennial Park
 510 West Linden Street
 Map location: 
 Softball park, currently the home of the Philadelphia Force

 Bucky Boyle Park
 North Front and West Linden Streets   
 Map location: 
 Two baseball diamonds,  large playarea

 Canal Park
 South Albert Street    
 Map location: 
 Large, wooded driving park between Lehigh Canal and Lehigh River with much green space

 Cedar Creek Park
 Along Parkway Boulevard, West End of Allentown    
 Map location: 
 Large park over 90 Acres, from Lake Muhlenburg west to Cedar Crest Boulevard.  Developed in the late 1920s by Mayor Malcom Gross, Sr.  Includes tennis courts, children's play area, Cedar Beach public swimming pool, Allentown Rose Garden and large areas for picnics and recreation activities.

 East Side Memorial Little League
 South Bradford and East Maple Streets    
 Map location: 
 Baseball diamond

 East Side Reservoir
 South Halstead and East Union Streets  
 Map location: 
 Large area for picnics and recreation activities.

 East Side Youth Center
 1140 East Clair Street     
 Map location: 
 Youth Center, baseball, soccer recreation fields

 Fellowship East Playlot
 North 2d and West Hamilton Streets     
 Map location: 
 Neighborhood playground

 Fountain Park
 Lehigh Street and Martin Luther King Drive     
 Map location: 
 Large, drive-thru park with public swimming pool, picnic and recreation areas

 Franklin Park
 218 North 14th Street   
 Map location: 
 Former Franklin Elementary School.  Combination children's playground and asphalt parking lot

 Hamilton Park Playlot
 South Ott Street & East Texas Boulevard   
 Map location: 
 Large park.  Two baseball diamonds, tennis courts, basketball court, children's play area, picnic and recreation area

 Howard Keck Juniata Playlot
 Keck & Juniata Streets   
 Map location: 
 Neighborhood playground, picnic and recreation area

 Irving Park
 North Irving and East Tilghman Streets   
 Map location: 
 Established in 1940. City Swimming pool, baseball diamonds, Basketball courts, picnic and recreation area

 Ithaca Playlot
 Ithaca & 31st Street Southwest   
 Map location: 
 Neighborhood playground, picnic and recreation area

 Jordan Meadows
 West Gordon Street & American Parkway  
 Map location: 
 Large park including tennis and basketball courts,  running track, athletic field, wooded areas and picnic areas along Jordan Creek

 Jordan Park
 Michigan Avenue & North Street Extension   
 Map location: 
 City public swimming pool.  Large park with numerous baseball diamonds, tennis and basketball courts, picnic and recreation areas along Jordan Creek

 Joseph S. Daddona Lake and Terrace
 South St. Elmo and West Union Street  
 Map location: 
 Formerly Union Terrace Park. Large, 21 Acre park built by WPA over a former mosquito wetland.  Park features WPA built grass and stone outdoor amphitheater. Includes Union Terrace Lake,  baseball diamonds and recreation fields, also areas for picnicking and recreation.

 Keck Park
 South Austin Street    
 Map location: 
 Driving park loop though wooded area.  also large grassy area for picnicking and recreation

 Kimmets Landing (Lehigh Canal)
 Allentown Drive and North Dauphin Street    
 Map location: 
 Former Lehigh Canal lock.  Wooded area, parking and small grassy areas for recreation

 Lehigh Landing
 West Hamilton & North Front Streets   
 Map location: 
 Part of America On Wheels Museum

 Lehigh Parkway
 Entrance at Park Drive and Ward Street  
 Map location: 
 Largest park in Allentown, 629 acres.  Land acquired in 1929, developed by Works Progress Administration (WPA) during the 1930s, providing jobs during the Great Depression years.  It is the most prominent park of the city and follows the Little Lehigh Stream for three miles. The park features many scenic exercising trails in addition to bridle paths, a shooting range, and many fishing locations.

 Lumber & Benton Playlot
 South Lunber and Benton Streets  
 Map location: 
 Neighborhood Playground

 Mack Pool
 2100 Mack Boulevard   
 Map location: 
 City public swimming pool and recreation area

 Mountainville Memorial Youth Association
 West Wabash and South 5th Streets   
 Map location: 
 Three baseball diamonds, large recreation field

 Nice 13 Tot Lot
 West Jackson and West Union Street   
 Map location: 
 Children's playground

 Old Fairgrounds Playground
 440 North 5th Street    
 Map location: 
 Neighborhood playground

 Patriots Park (1939)
 St. John and South Plumb Streets    
 Map location: 
 Baseball diamond, home of the Allentown Patriots softball team (1948-1976).   Lights, stands, community building erected in 1957.

 Percy B. Ruhe Park
 Oxford Drive and Pearl Avenue   
 Map location: 
 Formerly Alton Park Recreation Area.  Large park, tennis courts, baseball diamonds, picnic and recreation areas

 Roosevelt Park
 Camp and South Woodward Streets   
 Map location: 
 Seven acres in size.  Includes baseball diamond, picnic and recreation area

 Salisbury Dr Playlot
 3025 Salisbury Street  
 Map location: 
 Neighborhood children's playground

 South Mountain Reservoir and Park
 South 10th Street and Reservoir Road   
 Map location:   
 Reservoir area has long circular driving road and large athletic field.  Park area has scenic vista point from top of South Mountain

 South Street Playlot
 South & West Mosser Streets   
 Map location: 
 Neighborhood children' playground, picnic and recreation areas

 Sterners Island
 Island in Lehigh River, accessible only by boat  
 Map location: 
 Long, large wooded island.  No amenities

 Stevens Park
 North 6th & West Tilghman Streets   
 Map location: 
 Former Stevens Elementary School.  Neighborhood children' playground

 Trexler Memorial Park
 Springhouse Road  
 Map location: 
 Former summer home of General Harry Trexler.  Deeded to City of Allentown after Trexler's death in 1933. Now large park with lake, long biking road, large grassy and wooded areas for picnicking and recreation.  Wild game preserve, home of several hundred ducks, geese and swans.  Motor vehicles only allowed in parking area by park entrance.

 Trout Creek Park
 South 4th and Harrison Streets 
 Map location: 
 Large park along Trout Creek.   Long road though park,  primarily wooded and grassy areas for picnicking and recreation, baseball field.

 Turner & 4th Playlot
 West Turner and North 4th Streets   
 Map location: 
 Primarily wooded and grassy areas for picnicking and recreation

 Union Terrace
 South St. Elmo Street  
 Map location: 
 Wooded area

 Valania Park
 South Law and Union Streets   
 Map location: 
 Also known as John Valeniz Park.   Children's playground, basketball court, wooded area

 Waldon Terrace Playlot
 South Carbon Street    
 Map location: 
 Neighborhood children' playground, basketball court, recreation Field, picnic area

 West Park
 1550 West Turner Street    
 Map location: 
 Elegant park with walking paths.  Includes a community bandshell, now home of the Allentown Band. The park includes ornamental trees flower gardens, and a large central fountain

References

External links

Geography of Allentown, Pennsylvania
Parks in Lehigh County, Pennsylvania
Tourist attractions in Allentown, Pennsylvania